The Soccer America College Team of the Century were chosen by the editors of the American periodical Soccer America to comprise, as one men's and one women's eleven-member side divided each as one goalkeeper, three defenders, four midfielders, and three forwards, the best players of collegiate association football in the United States of the 20th century CE.

Men

Player of the Century
Concomitant to the selection of the Men's Team of the Century was that of the male player of the century; University of Virginia Cavaliers midfielder Claudio Reyna, a Division I first-team All America in each of his three collegiate seasons, a two-time recipient of the Missouri Athletic Club Player of the Year and Soccer America Player of the Year Awards, and the 1993 Hermann Trophy winner, was so chosen by Soccer America.

Team of the Century

Women

Player of the Century
Concomitant to the selection of the Women's Team of the Century was that of the female player of the century; North Carolina Tar Heels forward Mia Hamm, a Division I first-team All America in her final three collegiate seasons, a two-time recipient of the Hermann Trophy and the ISAA Player of the Year and Soccer America Player of the Year Awards, and with the Tar Heels four times a National Collegiate Athletic Association Division I champion, was so chosen.

Team of the Century

Notes

References
Brown, Gerry, and Morrison, Michael (eds.; 2003).  ESPN Information Please Sports Almanac.  New York City: ESPN Books and Hyperion (joint).  .

External links
Enumeration of the teams by HickokSports.com
 

College soccer trophies and awards in the United States